Stefano Raimondi (born 1 January 1998) is an Italian Paralympic swimmer who won 7 medals at the 2020 Summer Paralympics.

Achievements
Raimondi won 34 medals at the paralympic swimming international competitions.

See also
 Italy at the 2020 Summer Paralympics - Medalists

References

External links 
 

1998 births
Living people
Paralympic swimmers of Italy
Swimmers at the 2020 Summer Paralympics
Medalists at the 2020 Summer Paralympics
Paralympic medalists in swimming
Paralympic gold medalists for Italy
Paralympic silver medalists for Italy
Paralympic bronze medalists for Italy
Medalists at the World Para Swimming European Championships
Medalists at the World Para Swimming Championships
Paralympic athletes of Fiamme Oro
Italian male breaststroke swimmers
Italian male backstroke swimmers
Italian male butterfly swimmers
Italian male freestyle swimmers
Italian male medley swimmers
S10-classified Paralympic swimmers
21st-century Italian people